Edinburgh Peak is the highest mountain in Gough Island, South Atlantic Ocean.

Geography
Slightly lower Expedition Peak is located close to it. The island is part of the Tristan da Cunha Archipelago, an outlying territory of the United Kingdom. The mountain is an extinct volcano which erupted about 2,400 years ago.

See also
List of islands by highest point
List of mountains and hills of Saint Helena, Ascension and Tristan da Cunha

References

External links
Letters from a small island - Edinburgh Peak 3 - 1 Gough 56, 28 March to 3 April

Volcanoes of Tristan da Cunha
Mountains and hills of British Overseas Territories
Extinct volcanoes